Sorley and Somerled are masculine given names in the English language, Anglicizations of Scottish Gaelic Somhairle and Norse Sumarlidi.

Etymology 

The Gaelic name is a form of the English Somerled, and both names are ultimately derived from the Old Norse Old Norse . A variant form of Somerled is Summerlad, a name altered by folk etymology, derived from the words "summer" and "lad".  is sometimes Anglicised as Samuel, although these two names are etymologically unrelated (the latter being ultimately of Hebrew origin).

The Old Norse personal name likely originated as a byname, meaning "summer-traveller", "summer-warrior", in reference to a Viking, or men who took to raiding during the summer months as opposed to full-time raiders. Possibly the earliest record of the personal name occurs in a grant of land in Nottinghamshire by Edgar the Peaceful in 958. Several men with the name are recorded in early Icelandic sources, such as the 10th-century , and his son , Icelanders said to have been of Scottish and Hebridean ancestry.

List of persons with the given name

Somerled 
 Somerled (died 1164), Lord of Argyll, King of the Hebrides and Kintyre

, 17th-century Irish soldier

Sorley 
 Sorley Boy MacDonnell, (died 1590), Scottish/Irish chieftain
 Sorley MacLean, (1911–1996), one of the most significant Scottish poets of the 20th century

, 11th-century Earl of Orkney

See also
Sorley (surname)

Citations

References 

.
.
.
.
.
.
.
.

English-language masculine given names
Irish masculine given names
Scottish masculine given names
Scottish Gaelic masculine given names